Polistes major is a Neotropical species of paper wasp found from South America north into the southern United States. This species is known as avispa de caballo (Spanish: "horse's wasp") in the Dominican Republic.

Subspecies
There are five described subspecies:
 Polistes major bonaccensis Bequaert, 1937
 Polistes major castaneicolor Bequaert, 1936
 Polistes major colombianus Bequaert, 1940
 Polistes major major Palisot de Beauvois, 1818
 Polistes major weyrauchi Bequaert, 1940

Description
It is second in size only to P. carnifex. The coloration varies by subspecies, though the most widespread subspecies, P. m. major, has a reddish-brown ground color with broad yellow stripes. In contrast, the subspecies P. m. castaneicolor and P. m. weyrauchi are entirely reddish with no yellow markings.

References

major
Insects described in 1818